Rental utilization - economy
 Capacity utilization - load on some process
 Utilization management - medicine